Gia mia houfta touvla is a 1987 Greek comedy film which was released straight to video.  It was written by Manos Venieris and directed by Takis Vougiouklakis and stars Kostas Tsakonas, Tasos Kostis, Vera Gouma and Kostas Rigopoulos.

Plot
The movie tells the adventures of a hard-working tailor Aristos Avramoglou (Kostas Tsakonas) who tries to build a house in his mother's plot in Paiania. Then he confronted Greece of 1980's: bureaucracy, governmental favors and treacherous neighbors. Therefore, he discovers that his wife has been cheating him, with the local tavern-keeper Andronikos (Tasos Kostis), who mortgaged his house, in favor of Aristos to loan from Bank for the construction expenditures.

Cast
Kostas Tsakonas plays the character Aristos Avramoglou.
Tasos Kostis plays the character Andronikos.
Vera Gouma plays the character Toula Avramoglou.
Kostas Rigopoulos

External links

Gia mia choufta touvla at cine.gr

1987 films
1980s Greek-language films
1987 comedy films
Greek comedy films